Patrick Leonardo Carneiro da Silva, known as just Patrick Leonardo, is a Brazilian football striker. He played in the.

References

External links
 ogol.com

1990 births
Living people
Brazilian footballers
Brazilian expatriate footballers
Expatriate footballers in Turkey
Expatriate footballers in Portugal
Club Athletico Paranaense players
Portimonense S.C. players
Fortaleza Esporte Clube players
Clube Atlético Bragantino players
Primeira Liga players
Association football forwards